David Scotus was a Gaelic chronicler who died in 1139.

Biography 
His date of birth is unknown. Early in the twelfth century there was at Würzburg an ecclesiastic and teacher known as David. His surname Scotus shows that he was probably a Gael from either Ireland or Scotland, if he is identical with the homonymous  Bishop of Bangor, from Wales (see below).
 
According to Ekkehard's Chronicon, Emperor Henry V received him, was charmed with his virtue and knowledge, and made him one of the imperial chaplains. With other scholars, David accompanied Henry on his expedition to Italy in 1110, and was appointed royal historiographer for the occasion with the intention, perhaps, of drafting the emperor's relatio, a brief narrative stringing together the documents of the intended treaty and presenting his master's achievements in the best light. The expedition did not go to plan, with the incumbent Pope Pascal II at first refusing to crown Henry and his wife, Matilda, relenting only after two months of imprisonment. The work written by David has been lost, although it was used as authority in the writings of William of Malmesbury and Ordericus Vitalis.
 
He died in 1139.

Writings
His work in three books is now known only from excerpts of it in later historians, especially in Ekkehard and William of Malmesbury. The latter says that David described the expedition with partiality for the king.

Possibly identical homonym
A certain David was consecrated Bishop of Bangor in Wales, 4 April 1120; according to Malmesbury he was none other than the chaplain David Scotus. As bishop he took part in several English synods, and probably died in 1139, since his successor was then consecrated. But it is not easy to reconcile with the foregoing, the statement of the later historian Trithemius, that David became a monk under St. Macharius in the monastery of St. James in Würzburg, as this abbey was not founded until 1140.

See also

 Aaron Scotus (died 1052)
 Blessed Marianus Scotus (died circa 1088)
 Joseph Scottus (died near 800), Irish deacon, scholar, diplomat, poet, and ecclesiastic
 Johannes Scotus Eriugena (circa 815–877), Irish theologian
 Marianus Scotus (circa 1028–1082), Irish monk
 Marianus Scotus (died c. 1088), Irish abbot of St Peter's at Ratisbon (Regensburg)
 Sedulius Scottus (9th century), Irish teacher, grammarian and Scriptural commentator

Notes

Sources
 

Irish chroniclers
12th-century Irish historians
1139 deaths
Medieval European scribes
Medieval Gaels
Year of birth unknown
Irish expatriates in Germany
Irish Latinists